Maple is an unincorporated community, located in the town of Maple, Douglas County, Wisconsin, United States.

The community is located 22 miles east of the city of Superior.

U.S. Highway 2 serves as a main route in the community.

Maple has a post office with ZIP code 54854.

References

Unincorporated communities in Douglas County, Wisconsin
Unincorporated communities in Wisconsin